"Think About That" is a song by English singer and songwriter Jessie J. The song was released on 15 September 2017 through Republic Records, as the second single from her fourth studio album, R.O.S.E. (2018). Four singles from R.O.S.E. were released, with "Think About That" representing realisation.

Composition 
"Think About That" is an R&B song led by a piano melody hovering over R&B percussion. It lyrically talks about a gritty love gone wrong, containing the lyrics: "All you disturb is my work and my patience/ Years of grinding, you took it, you broke it/ All 'cause you fake it/ You wanna be famous." The singer revealed she wrote the song when she almost quit music, and credits the song for helping her getting "out of a rut with her music."

The singer described her writer's block in a video titled R.O.S.E. Confessional:

Music video
A music video for the song was released on the same day. It was directed by Erik Rojas, Brian Ziff and Jessie J. The video opens with the singer with her hands tied, dripping wet. She's soon freed, wearing a fishnet body stocking and a BDSM-esque leather mask. The video then consists of her crawling at the camera and dancing on a dim, smoky street. The video was filmed in black and white, and contains references to BDSM.

Track listing 
Digital download

Credits and personnel 
Adapted from Tidal.
 Jessica Cornish - lead vocals, songwriting
 Darhyl Camper - songwriting, production, programmer
 Simone Torres - engineer
 Jaycen Joshua - mixing
 Iván Jiménez - assistant mixing
 David Nakaji - assistant mixing
 Kuk Harrell - other

References

2017 singles
2017 songs
Jessie J songs
Songs written by Jessie J
Republic Records singles
Songs written by Darhyl Camper